Gorumna is an island on the west coast of Ireland, forming part of County Galway.

Geography 
Gorumna Island is linked with the mainland through the Béal an Daingin Bridge. 
Gorumna properly consists of three individual islands in close proximity, Lettermullen, Teeranea (Irish: Tír an Fhia) and Lettermore.

Contribution to Irish traditional music
During the 1860s in South Boston, Massachusetts, Bríd Ní Mháille, an immigrant from the Gorumna village of Trá Bhán, composed the Irish-language caoine  Amhrán na Trá Bháine, which is about the drowning of her three brothers, whose currach was rammed and sunk while they were out at sea. Ní Mháille's lament for her brothers was first performed at a ceilidh in South Boston before being brought back to her native district in Connemara, where it continues to be passed down as both a work of oral poetry and as a very popular song among performers and fans of Irish traditional music.

Geology 
Gorumna Island is mostly underlain by intrusive Devonian-aged Galway Granite that formed from crustal melting as a result of the Caledonian Orogeny in the late Silurian. Its southern tip also includes Ordovician-aged bedrock of sedimentary marine rocks and basalt.

Demographics 
The table below reports data on Gorumna Island's population taken from Discover the Islands of Ireland (Alex Ritsema, Collins Press, 1999) and the census of Ireland.

References

Islands - Change in Population 1841 - 2011

Other projects
 

Islands of County Galway
Gaeltacht towns and villages